Al-e Yusefi-ye Olya (also Romanized as Āl-e Yūsefī-ye ‘Olyā and Āl-e Yūsofī-ye ‘Olyā; also known as Āl-e Sefī-ye Bālā, Āl-e Yūsefī-ye Bālā, Āl-e Yūsofī, and Āl-e Yūsofī-ye Bālā) is a village in Zirrah Rural District, Sadabad District, Dashtestan County, Bushehr Province, Iran. At the 2006 census, its population was 222, in 53 families.

References 

Populated places in Dashtestan County